Idalys Yaruma Pérez Hernández (born 20 July 1996) is a Venezuelan footballer who plays as a midfielder for Ecuadorian club CSD Independiente del Valle. She was a member of the Venezuela women's national team.

International career
Pérez represented Venezuela at the 2012 South American U-17 Women's Championship, two South American U-20 Women's Championship editions (2014 and 2015) and the 2016 FIFA U-20 Women's World Cup. At senior level, she played two Copa América Femenina editions (2014 and 2018) and the 2014 Central American and Caribbean Games.

References

1996 births
Living people
Women's association football midfielders
Women's association football wingers
Venezuelan women's footballers
People from San Felipe, Venezuela
Venezuela women's international footballers
Competitors at the 2014 Central American and Caribbean Games
América de Cali footballers
Cortuluá footballers
C.S.D. Independiente del Valle footballers
Venezuelan expatriate women's footballers
Venezuelan expatriate sportspeople in Colombia
Expatriate women's footballers in Colombia
Venezuelan expatriate sportspeople in Ecuador
Expatriate women's footballers in Ecuador
Place of birth missing (living people)